Mongefossen is a waterfall in the Rauma Municipality of Møre og Romsdal county, Norway. It is the fourth tallest single-drop waterfall in the world. It's located near the European route E136 highway and the Rauma River, which it flows into. As is the case with many of Norway's waterfalls, it has been targeted for hydroelectric power, which results in a greatly diminished water flow during the summer tourist season.

Mongefossen also holds the distinction as being the highest waterfall in the world which may be viewed from a railway station on the Rauma Line, on the north side between the villages of Flatmark and Marstein.

See also
List of waterfalls by height

References

External links
Old picture of the unregulated falls

Rauma, Norway
Horsetail waterfalls
Waterfalls of Møre og Romsdal